MAC³PARK Stadion is a multi-use stadium in Zwolle, Netherlands.  It is used mostly for football matches and hosts the home matches of PEC Zwolle. The stadium has an official capacity of 14,000.  The stadium replaced Oosterenkstadion as the home of PEC Zwolle.

On 12 July 2012 PEC Zwolle announced the new name for their home ground, IJsseldelta Stadion. The current name, MAC³PARK Stadion, was unveiled in November 2015 and officially adopted on 1 July 2016.

References

External links
 Over het MAC³PARK stadion, peczwolle.nl 
 MAC³PARK stadion (Zwolle Stadion), stadiumdb.com

PEC Zwolle
Multi-purpose stadiums in the Netherlands
Football venues in the Netherlands
Sports venues in Overijssel
Sports venues completed in 2009
Buildings and structures in Zwolle
Sport in Zwolle